(Victoriaville) 1992 is a live album by composer and saxophonist Anthony Braxton recorded at the Festival International de Musique Actuelle de Victoriaville in Canada in 1992 and released on the Victo label.

Reception

The Allmusic review by Brian Olewnick stated:

Track listing
All compositions by Anthony Braxton except where noted.
 "Composition No 159+ (131+30+147)" – 10:41
 "Composition No 148+ (108a+139+147)" – 20:32
 "Composition No 161" – 12:53
 "Composition No 158+ (108c+147)" – 15:04
 "Impressions" (John Coltrane) – 6:45

Personnel
Anthony Braxton – alto saxophone, soprano saxophone, sopranino saxophone
Marilyn Crispell – piano
Mark Dresser – bass
Gerry Hemingway – drums, percussion

References

Anthony Braxton live albums
1993 live albums